The 2010 RAC Tourist Trophy was an auto race held at the Silverstone Circuit, Northamptonshire and Buckinghamshire, Great Britain from 30 April–2 May.  The event, the second round of the 2010 FIA GT1 World Championship season, was among the first to use the revised  Arena layout of the Silverstone Circuit that was completed in early 2010.  The GT1 series was part of the larger Silverstone Supercar 2010 event, sharing the weekend with the FIA GT3 European Championship, GT4 European Cup, and the British Formula 3 Championship.  The Championship race also served to award an annual champion for RAC Tourist Trophy, awarded by the Royal Automobile Club.

The British manufacturer Aston Martin dominated much of the early event, winning pole position in Qualifying with Darren Turner and Tomáš Enge's Young Driver AMR entry before Hexis AMR swept the top two spots in the Qualifying Race, led by drivers Frédéric Makowiecki and Thomas Accary.  Turner and Enge would then go on to win the Championship Race, but were later excluded from the race when their Aston Martin failed technical inspections.  This, as well as a time penalty for a Hexis Aston Martin, promoted initial third-place finishers Jamie Campbell-Walter and Warren Hughes of Sumo Power Nissan to the race victory and the award of the Tourist Trophy.  Aston Martin settled for second, while Lamborghini earned their first podium in the championship with a third place.

Background

Following the opening round in Abu Dhabi, the Nissan teams of Sumo Power GT and Swiss Racing Team voiced their opinions on the balance of performance which was used in Abu Dhabi.  The teams believed that the tests held prior to race has unfairly allowed the Nissan GT-R to be too hindered heavily weighted compared to its competitors, receiving  of extra ballast weight.  Sumo Power and Swiss Racing left Abu Dhabi without earning any championship points.  Allen Orchard of Sumo Power GT stated that the team planned to protest to the FIA, while Othmar Welti of Swiss Racing Team even threatened to boycott the event if the ballast remained unchanged.  On 27 April the FIA made further changes to the balance of performance, making alterations to the weights of five of the six manufacturers.  Corvette and Maserati both gained extra ballast while Aston Martin, Lamborghini, and Nissan all shed some of their previous ballast weight.  The Lamborghini and Maserati also had air restrictor modifications made.

Besides the adjustments made to the balance of performance, four entries also enter Silverstone carrying further ballast due to their success in Abu Dhabi.  The No. 5 Matech Ford which won the Championship Race in Abu Dhabi will carry , while the No. 13 and No. 14 Phoenix Corvettes and No. 1 Vitaphone Maserati will also have success weight.  The field for the event has also been diminished by one with the absence of the No. 6 Matech Ford following its heavy crash in qualifying at Abu Dhabi and the continuing recovery of its driver Natacha Gachnang.  Matech drivers Romain Grosjean and Thomas Mutsch let the Drivers Championship with 33 points, five ahead of Phoenix drivers Marc Hennerici and Andreas Zuber.  Phoenix Racing / Carsport meanwhile led the Teams Championship with 41 points ahead of Matech's 31.

Following the 2010 eruptions of Eyjafjallajökull that caused disruption to air travel in Europe, the organiser of the FIA GT1 World Championship, Stéphane Ratel Organisation, expressed worries that cargo planes carrying cars and equipment would not be able to be transported to the United Kingdom. Nonetheless, two cargo planes were able to land in Luxembourg on the morning of 22 April and two charter flights arrived in Austria later that day, allowing the race to continue as scheduled.

The 2010 running of the RAC Tourist Trophy included four former winners of the event, included two-time defending winner Karl Wendlinger attempting to win his third in succession.  Vitaphone drivers Michael Bartels and Andrea Bertolini previously shared the win in 2006 while Peter Kox won the event in 2005.

Qualifying
The GT1 qualifying session was held early on Saturday, 1 May, with all 23 participants taking part in the initial twenty-minute first session.  By the end of the first quarter of the session, local driver Oliver Gavin in the No. 12 Mad-Croc Corvette led the field with the fastest time of the weekend, the first lap under the 2:01 mark, then breaking under an even 2:00 within his next few laps.  Halfway through the session the No. 37 Münnich Lamborghini of Christophe Bouchut and No. 3 Swiss Nissan of Karl Wendlinger came into contact with one another at the Brooklands corner, leading both cars to spin to a stop but eventually resume.  With less than four minutes left in the session, the No. 8 Young Driver Aston Martin, driven by Stefan Mücke, went to the top of the time charts with a lap of 1:59.694 where it would remain until the session ended.  On the final lap of the session, Jos Menten in the Reiter Lamborghini climbed out of the bottom seven times, staving off elimination.  The seven slowest cars at the end of the session, which are knocked out of the qualifying session per GT1 regulations, included both Marc VDS Fords, both Münnich Lamborghinis, both Swiss Nissans, and the No. 11 Mad-Croc Corvette.

For the first time in the FIA GT1 World Championship, qualifying reached the second session, with the sixteen remaining cars running for fifteen minutes.  Anthony Kumpen, driving the No. 14 Phoenix Corvette led the session early before having the top spot taken by a quick succession of drivers.  Michael Bartels initially took the lead in the No. 1 Vitaphone Maserati, then was overtaken on the time charts by Peter Dumbreck in the No. 23 Sumo Power Nissan, before Frank Kechele in the No. 25 Reiter Lamborghini led the field less than a minute later.  With approximately three minutes left in the session, Jonathan Hirschi put the No. 10 Hexis Aston Martin on top with a time of 1:59.796 and would be able to maintain the first position as the session came to an end.  Teams knocked out at the end of the session included both Phoenix Corvettes and both Hegersport Maseratis, the No. 2 Vitaphone Maserati and No. 12 Mad-Croc Corvette, as well as the championship-leading No 5. Matech Ford and the No. 8 Young Driver Aston Martin which had been quickest in the first qualifying session.

Eight cars remained for the final ten-minute session, with Frédéric Makowiecki in the No. 9 Hexis Aston Martin setting the early pace with the first lap under 2:00.  As the qualifying session ended and the cars completed their final flying lap, Darren Turner, who only brought the No. 7 Young Driver Aston Martin to the circuit in the final five minutes, earned pole position with a lap of 1:58.808, over four tenths of a second ahead of the No. 9 Hexis Aston Martin, giving Aston Martin the lead of all three qualifying sessions and a lockout of the front row of the grid, ahead of a Sumo Power Nissan and Vitaphone Maserati on the second row.

Qualifying result
For qualifying, Driver 1 participates in the first and third sessions while Driver 2 participates in only the second session.  The fastest lap for each session is indicated with bold.

1. The No. 24 Reiter Lamborghini was given a penalty of three grid spots for crossing the pit entry line twice during qualifying.

Races

Qualifying race

From the rolling start, the pole sitting No. 7 Young Driver Aston Martin of Tomáš Enge led the field as they battled into the first corner, jumping out ahead of the No 9 Hexis Aston Martin and No. 1 Vitaphone Maserati.  Further down the field the No. 33 Hegersport Maserati spun in the middle of the first turn after hitting one of the Reiter Lamborghinis, which then made contact with the No. 8 Young Driver Aston Martin.  The Aston Martin's left rear tyre was cut down by the contact and Christoffer Nygaard was forced to make an early pit stop for a new tyre.  The Hegersport Maserati meanwhile, although briefly continuing, was forced to enter the team's garage several laps later with engine problems.  On the tenth lap of the race, Abu Dhabi race winner Thomas Mutsch spun the No. 5 Matech Ford into a gravel trap outside Maggotts corner while defending 13th place.  The Ford would lose a lap while being extracted and returning to the race.

By the time the pit window opened in the 25th minute, Enge led the field by over two seconds.  Darren Turner was able to take over the No. 7 Aston Martin during the team's pit stop and retained the race lead but minutes later officials announced drive-thru penalties for the No. 7, No. 23 Sumo Power Nissan, and No. 34 Hegersport Maserati for all cutting the pit lane entry.  All three returned to the pits to serve their penalty on the next lap, but while entering the pits Turner cut the entry and earned a stop-and-go penalty.  After the two penalties the Young Driver Aston Martin had fallen to seventh, with the No 9 Hexis Aston Martin now leading.  During pit stop window the No. 10 Hexis Aston Martin managed to take over second after the No. 1 Vitaphone Maserati stalled in the pits.

During the closing ten minutes of the race the two Swiss Nissans were attempting to catch the No. 37 Münnich Lamborghini for fourteenth place, but collided with one another in the Vale corner and spun Karl Wendlinger in the No. 3 car.  Meanwhile, at the front of the field Darren Turner had begun to reclaim lost positions by passing the No. 23 Sumo Power Nissan for sixth place, then the No. 14 Phoenix Corvette for fifth.  Turner would eventually claim the fourth position in the final two laps but would miss out on a podium finish for the race end.  Hexis driver Frédéric Makowiecki led the field across the line for the race win, ahead of his teammate Clivio Piccione in second place, with the No. 1 Vitaphone Maserati in third.

Race result

Championship race

The Sunday Championship Race was held under colder damp conditions than Saturday's Qualifying Race, with the grid lining up in their finishing positions from the previous day.  Four cars were awarded penalties by the race stewards following Saturday's race and demoted five grid positions from original position; both Mad-Croc Corvettes as well as the No. 24 Reiter Lamborghini were demoted, while the No. 8 Young Driver Aston Martin was already starting from the back of the field.

At the start of the race Hexis' Jonathan Hirschi led into the first corner, followed by teammate and polesitter Frédéric Makowiecki and the fellow Aston Martin of Darren Turner.  Andrea Bertolini in the No. 1 Vitaphone Maserati slipped from his third place grid position to seventh.  Towards the back of the field Romain Grosjean was hit from behind by the No. 33 Hegersport Maserati, bouncing the Ford into the side of the No. 8 Young Driver Aston Martin and Grosjean to spin to the outside of the first turn.  Suspension damaged in the accident would render the Ford unable to restart the race.  During the second lap Hirschi ran wide at the Stowe corner and allowed Makoweicki to take over the race lead, while Warren Hughes took fourth place from Jos Menten's Reiter Lamborghini.  As the race entered the third lap, the No. 8 Young Driver Aston Martin was forced to make a pit stop to replace a tyre punctured in the earlier incident while the No. 14 Phoenix Racing Corvette began to billow smoke on the Hangar Straight.  Mike Hezemans spun the Corvette and came to a stop where the rear of car became enveloped in flames.  While Hezemans successfully exited the car, the clean-up by track officials required the intervention of the safety car, neutralizing the race.

The safety car was withdrawn on the seventh lap and Makowiecki once again led the field.

Race result

Post-event
Despite failing to finish the championship race and earning no points in either race Thomas Mutsch and Romain Grosjean were able to sustain their lead in the Drivers Championship by a margin of five points, aided by a lack of points earned by Marc Hennerici and Andreas Zuber.  However podium finishes in the Qualifying and Championship races have elevated Hexis drivers Frédéric Makowiecki and Thomas Accary and Vitaphone drivers Michael Bartels and Andrea Bertolini to even points with Hennerici and Zuber.  Jamie Campbell-Walter and Warren Hughes, by winning the Championship race and earning their first points for the season, now sit fifth in the Drivers Championship.

As in the Drivers Championship, Phoenix Racing / Carsport retained the Teams Championship lead without gaining any points at Silverstone.  Vitaphone Racing Team moved from third to second after earning points in both the Qualifying and Championship Races, while Hexis AMR's three podiums in the two races promoted them to third in the standings.

Standings

Drivers Championship standings

Teams Championship standings

References

External links

 Silverstone GT1 Race in Great Britain – FIA GT1 World Championship

RAC Tourist Trophy
RAC Tourist Trophy
RAC Tourist Trophy